The following is a sortable table of all songs by Lower Than Atlantis:

The column Song list the song title.
The column Writer(s) lists who wrote the song.
The column Album lists the album the song is featured on.
The column Producer lists the producer of the song.
The column Year lists the year in which the song was released.
The column Length list the length/duration of the song.

Studio recordings

See also
 Lower Than Atlantis discography

References
 Footnotes
Later included as bonus tracks on the US version of World Record (2011).
Bonus tracks on the deluxe edition of Changing Tune (2012).
Released for free download from SoundCloud in 2013.
Bonus tracks on the deluxe edition of Lower Than Atlantis (2014).
Bonus tracks on the Black Edition of Lower Than Atlantis.

 Citations

Lower Than Atlantis